Frederick Davis "Ted" Wingfield (August 7, 1899 – July 18, 1975) was a professional baseball pitcher. He played all or part of five seasons in Major League Baseball from 1923 through 1927 for the Washington Senators (1923–24) and Boston Red Sox (1924–27). He was born in Bedford, Virginia.
 
In a five-season career, Wingfield posted a 24–44 record with a 4.18 ERA in 113 appearances, including 57 starts, 31 complete games, three shutouts, five saves, and 553.1 innings pitched. His best season statistically was 1925, when he posted career bests in wins (12), strikeouts (30), and innings pitched (254.1) while having an ERA of 3.96.

Wingfield was notable for an especially low rate of strikeouts as a pitcher. In 553 1/3 innings, he struck out only 68 batters, or 1.1 per 9 innings. In his final season, over  innings, he struck out a grand total of one batter. He struck out Chick Galloway, a good contact hitter, in a game in which Wingfield pitched poorly, allowing seven runs in three innings.

Wingfield died at the age of 75 in Johnson City, Tennessee.

References

External links

Retrosheet

Major League Baseball pitchers
Boston Red Sox players
Washington Senators (1901–1960) players
Chattanooga Lookouts players
Nashville Vols players
Hartford Senators players
Minneapolis Millers (baseball) players
Baseball players from Virginia
1899 births
1975 deaths
People from Bedford, Virginia